Giorgio Bertellini an Italian-American media historian who specializes in the ways national and racial diversity informed American cinema's representation of citizenship, stardom, and leadership during the era of migrations, fascism, and World War II. He is currently Professor in the Department of Film, Television, and Media at the University of Michigan.

Life 
Born in Mantua, Italy, Bertellini studied philosophy at the Università Cattolica del Sacro Cuore and earned his Ph.D. in cinema studies at New York University Tisch School of the Arts. He moved to the University of Michigan, Ann Arbor, in 2001 as a Junior Fellow in the Michigan Society of Fellows  and is currently Professor in the Department of Film, Television, and Media at the same institution with a courtesy appointment in the Department of Romance Languages. He was the Sargent-Faull Fellow  at the Radcliffe Institute for Advanced Studies (2007-08) and a Tiro a Segno Fellow  in New York University's Italian Studies department.

Recognition 

His work twice received the American Association of Italian Studies  book award for film and media (2010 and 2020). His other book awards include the Robert K. Martin Best Book Prize (Canadian Association for American Studies, 2010),  the Peter C. Rollins Book Award (Southwest Popular and American Culture Association), 2015), and the IASA Book Award from the Italian American Studies Association, 2020). His work has been supported by the American Philosophical Association, Consiglio Nazionale delle Ricerche, and the Radcliffe Institute for Advanced Studies. In 2022, he was selected as one of 180 Guggenheim fellows, a John Simon Guggenheim Memorial Foundation-sponsored scholarship.

Works 
 The Cinema of Italy. Wallflower Press, 2004/2007. .
 Early Cinema and the 'National': Early Cinema in Review: Proceedings of Domitor.  (Co-edited with Richard Abel and Rob King). John Libbey Publishing, 2008.  
 Italy in Early American Cinema: Race, Landscape, and the Picturesque. Indiana University Press, 2009. 
 Emir Kusturica (Contemporary Film Directors). University of Illinois Press, 2015.  Milan: Editrice Il Castoro, 1996. ; 2nd expanded ed., 2001 ; English Edition: Champaign: University of Illinois Press, 2015. ; Romanian Edition: Bucharest: IBU Publishing, 2017.
 Italian Silent Cinema: A Reader. John Libbey Publishing, 2013.
 The Divo and the Duce: Promoting Film Stardom and Political Leadership in 1920s America. University of California Press, 2019. 
Il Divo e il Duce. Fama, politica e pubblicità nell'America degli anni Venti. Florence: Le Monnier, 2022.

References

External links 
 

Living people
1967 births
People from Mantua
University of Michigan faculty
Italian film historians
Italian emigrants to the United States
21st-century Italian historians
Università Cattolica del Sacro Cuore alumni
Tisch School of the Arts alumni
Historians of American media